Czernina may refer to:
Czernina, a type of Polish soup
Czernina, Lower Silesian Voivodeship in Gmina Góra, Góra County in Lower Silesian Voivodeship (SW Poland)